Daniel Ian Bentley (born 13 July 1993) is an English professional footballer who plays as a goalkeeper for Premier League club Wolverhampton Wanderers. He has played in the English Football League for Southend United, Brentford and Bristol City.

Career

Southend United

Bentley was born in Basildon, Essex and began his career as a centre back with hometown club Hutton Medway. A one-off appearance as a goalkeeper was witnessed by an Arsenal scout, who brought Bentley to the club's academy at age eight. He was released in 2008 and quickly signed for Southend United, with whom he started his apprenticeship in March 2009. Bentley was sent out on loan to Conference South club Braintree Town initially on cover for one match. However, he ended up staying and made two appearances for the club against Welling United and Dover Athletic. He was given his first professional contract in the summer of 2011, on a two-year deal. He made his first-team debut for the Shrimpers on 22 October 2011 in a 4–1 win over Torquay United, replacing the injured Glenn Morris in the second half.

Following an injury to first choice Southend United goalkeeper Paul Smith, Bentley was called upon to deputise and played in his first run of first-team matches in the 2012–13 season, making his full debut for Southend on 22 September 2012 against Exeter City, a match Southend won 2–1. Bentley went on to play further matches against Plymouth, and Burton Albion before Paul Smith returned to full fitness.

Bentley continued to play in cup matches, and developed a reputation for being a good penalty saver. As a consequence, with a Football League Trophy southern area semi-final against Oxford United seemingly heading to Penalties, Southend manager Paul Sturrock substituted starting goalkeeper Paul Smith for Bentley in the 90th minute, provoking an angry reaction from Smith. Bentley went on to save Alfie Potter's spot kick and Southend won 5–3 on penalties, progressing to the Southern area final. Sturrock justified the decision by stating "Bentley has been fantastic at penalties all his career, and it worked, he saved one".

2013–14 season
Bentley kept 19 clean sheets during the 2013–14 season. His impressive performances linked him with a move to Leeds United with Leeds' manager Brian McDermott watching Bentley in Southend's 3–0 win against Rochdale on Good Friday. After being linked with a move to Leeds, Bentley proclaimed that he would not let the speculation of a potential move affect his performances.

2014–15 season
Over the summer of 2014 Bentley was linked with moves to Premier League clubs, but eventually remained at Southend, and in the early part of the following season he was considered for the England U21s, however he was not selected.

In the 2014–15 season, Bentley broke Mervyn Cawston's club record of 10 consecutive home clean sheets with 12 in a row between October and April.

Southend made it the play-off final at Wembley Stadium where they played against Wycombe Wanderers. The match was goalless after 90 minutes, however 5 minutes into extra-time Wycombe took the lead through an own goal from Bentley. A free kick from Joe Jacobson hit the crossbar before rebounding off of the diving Bentley's back into the goal. However, with 20 seconds remaining, Southend took the match to a penalty shoot-out, in which Bentley was the hero after saving penalties from Matt Bloomfield and Sam Wood, meaning that Southend won promotion to League One.

The season was full of accolades for Bentley, winning all three of the club's end of season awards – supporters' player, players' player and community player of the year. He was named the Football League Young Player of the Month for April 2015 and made the League Two PFA Team of the Year along with teammate Ben Coker.

2015–16 season
In the 2015 summer transfer window Bentley was subject of three bids from Queens Park Rangers, the 3rd and final offer being £1.25m which Southend chairman Ron Martin rejected.

On 31 August 2015 Bentley produced a man of the match performance away at Coventry City in a 2–2, the fine display including a penalty save. Bentley remained a Southend United player when the transfer window closed on 1 September.

Brentford
On 1 July 2016, Bentley signed for Championship club Brentford on a four-year contract with a compensation fee of £1.1 million. The fee would rise if Bentley reaches a certain number of appearances.

Bristol City
Bentley signed for Bristol City on 28 June 2019 on a four-year contract for an undisclosed fee.

Wolverhampton Wanderers
Bentley signed a two-and-a-half-year deal with Wolverhampton Wanderers on 25 January 2023 for an undisclosed fee.

Career statistics

Honours
Southend United
Football League Two play-offs: 2015

Individual
Football League Young Player of the Month: February 2015
Southend United Player of the Year: 2014–15
Southend United Players' Player of the Year: 2014–15
Southend United Community Player of the Year: 2014–15
PFA Team of the Year: 2014–15 League Two
London Football Awards London Goalkeeper of the Year: 2018

References

External links

Profile at the Wolverhampton Wanderers F.C. website

1993 births
Living people
Sportspeople from Basildon
English footballers
Association football goalkeepers
Arsenal F.C. players
Southend United F.C. players
Braintree Town F.C. players
Brentford F.C. players
Bristol City F.C. players
Wolverhampton Wanderers F.C. players
National League (English football) players
English Football League players